Johnny Hott was the drummer for the House of Freaks, a musical duo with singer/guitarist Bryan Harvey. He was also one of three drummers for the band Cracker. He has also played drums for indie supergroup Gutterball and drums and keyboards for Sparklehorse.
Hott remains an active musician and lives in Richmond, Virginia.

References

Year of birth missing (living people)
Living people
Hott, Johnny
Cracker (band) members